Bill Hopkins (born 13 March 1936) is a former  Australian rules footballer who played with South Melbourne in the Victorian Football League (VFL).

Notes

External links 

Living people
1936 births
Australian rules footballers from Victoria (Australia)
Sydney Swans players
Murchison Football Club players